Impossible Creatures is a 2003 steampunk real-time strategy game developed by Relic Entertainment and published by Microsoft Game Studios. Its unique feature is that the armies used in gameplay are all created by the player, and involve combining two animals to make a new super creature with various abilities. The concept was inspired by H. G. Wells' novel The Island of Doctor Moreau. The player-created armies are capped at 9 creatures; each one is a combination of any two animals from a list of 76 (51 with no downloads). Many animals possess inherent abilities to add more strategic depth to the game. There is an extensive single-player campaign as well as online multiplayer functionality with different game modes, add-ons, custom maps, mods, and scenarios.

Impossible Creatures was followed up later by a free downloadable expansion entitled Insect Invasion which added new creatures and abilities to the game. The last official add-on for Impossible Creatures was released in 2004.

On November 12, 2015, Impossible Creatures was released on Steam as Impossible Creatures: Steam Edition, by THQ Nordic. Relic Entertainment and Sega relinquished the rights of Impossible Creatures to THQ Nordic after it was revealed that neither THQ nor Microsoft Studios owned the rights to the video game.

The Steam version includes all patches and expansion packs released in the past, the IC Online servers reimplemented through Steam's cloud service and the game's modding software development kit included in the package alongside the Mission Editor originally available within the game's files. Steam Workshop support came out in Patch 3. The Steam Edition is also optimized for modern computer systems and software. The game was also released on GOG.com shortly after it appeared on Steam.

Gameplay

Campaign
This mode consists of 15 different missions, spanning over a group of islands in the South Pacific known as the Isla Variatas, indicating the variety of environments presented to the player, ranging from jungles, deserts, or Arctic regions. The protagonist Rex Chance is required to collect animal DNA throughout the campaign in order to add more animal varieties to his army of combined creatures.

Multiplayer
In Impossible Creatures, there are three game types available during multiplayer, which allows for up to six players at once. In "Destroy Enemy Lab", the first to destroy the enemies' main laboratories is the winner. The Insect Invasion official mod added a feature that can be turned on that defends the lab, at the cost of 35 points of electricity per second. In "Destroy Enemy Base", the winner is the first to destroy all enemy buildings, including the lab. In "Hunt Rex", each player is given a special unit, Rex Chance. Players must hunt down and kill other participants' Rex Chance units. Multiplayer games can be played via the IC Online (ICO) service, via a LAN connection, or by connecting directly to the host player's IP address.

Plot
Dr. Eric Chanikov was one of the brightest scientific minds in history. After a failed experiment causes the Tunguska Event and kills his wife, he goes into willing exile at a chain of remote islands. There, he reports the creation of the Sigma Technology, a method which makes it possible to fuse two creatures together into a single organism. These reports are ignored by the scientific and mainstream communities.

Then in 1937, believing that his last days are upon him, Chanikov sends a letter to his son Rex asking him to come visit his father. Rex, going by the name of "Rex Chance", a disgraced war reporter, travels to the archipelago. Discovering that his father died at the hands of the evil tycoon Upton Julius, he vows to avenge his father's murder. He is assisted by the late Chanikov's assistant Dr. Lucy Willing. With her help, Rex quickly learns the power of the Sigma technology, and more about his family's past. As he spends time around the Sigma technology, latent abilities are made manifest within him. These abilities make him increasingly superhuman, allowing him to directly assist his Sigma Creatures in battle.

Lucy and Rex's progress is slowed by those loyal to Julius: Whitey Hooten, a whaler whose Sigma-created creatures are slow and powerful, Velika la Pette, a high-strung aristocrat who relies on aerial units, and Dr. Ganglion, a mad scientist fond of using creatures most would call abominations.

Julius is confronted and defeated at the end of the game. The reasoning behind Rex's latent abilities is at last revealed: he is the accidental first product of the Sigma technology, a human combined with thousands of animal traits. As the game closes, Rex is shown with his pupils missing, a trait common among Sigma-created creatures.

Development
According to early previews, players had to tranquilize creatures and bring them back to the base to collect their DNA. In the final product, though, it is enough for Rex to shoot a creature to collect its DNA. This only applies to the single-player campaign; in a regular multi-player skirmish, all creatures are readily available.

Despite the fact that the game was not released on Steam until 2015, Impossible Creatures was one of the first titles that Valve used to demonstrate Steam in 2003. This was probably due to Valve and Relic’s close relationship; as both had worked with Sierra Online.

The development of the 2015 remastered edition involved recreating much of Relic's postlaunch work on the SDK and Insect Invasion add-on, as well as rewriting the multiplayer networking for Steam and modern firewalls. Before and after the Steam re-release, the Tellurian mod—which adds many creatures, maps, and balancing tweaks—became a large focal point for the game's community. In fact, fixes made by the Tellurian mod developers were integrated back into the base game in an official patch.

Reception

The game received "average" reviews according to video game review aggregator Metacritic.

Maxim gave it a score of eight out of ten and said, "Once you get past all the gamesmanship, you can concentrate on bitch-slapping Mother Nature by creating twisted beasts that would make Jack Hanna brown his khakis."  However, The Cincinnati Enquirer gave it three-and-a-half stars out of five and said that its gameplay "doesn't match the title's ingenious premise."  Entertainment Weekly gave it a C, saying, "If most real-time strategy titles are elaborate versions of rock-paper-scissors, Impossible Creatures is the world's most sophisticated game of rock."

See also
Spore
L.O.L.: Lack of Love
Seventh Cross: Evolution
Evolution: The Game of Intelligent Life
E.V.O.: Search for Eden
Creatures
SimLife
SimEarth
Genewars
Evolva
Tokyo Jungle

References

External links
 
 
 

2003 video games
Lua (programming language)-scripted video games
Microsoft games
Real-time strategy video games
Video games about genetic engineering
Video games about insects
Video games scored by Jeremy Soule
Video games set on fictional islands
Video games developed in Canada
Windows games
Windows-only games
Multiplayer and single-player video games
Relic Entertainment games